Amauropsis aureolutea is a species of predatory sea snail, a marine gastropod mollusk in the family Naticidae, the moon snails. The maximum recorded shell length is 32 mm. The minimum recorded depth is 6 m, while the maximum recorded depth is 662 m.

References

Naticidae
Gastropods described in 1908